Glyptocera is a genus of snout moths. It was described by Ragonot in 1889, and contains the species G. consobrinella. It is found in eastern North America, including Alabama, Florida, Illinois, Maryland, Michigan, Mississippi, Nova Scotia, Ohio, Oklahoma, Ontario and Quebec.

The larvae feed on Viburnum (including Viburnum lentago) and Acer species.

References

Phycitinae
Monotypic moth genera
Moths of North America